Micranthes is a genus of flowering plants in the saxifrage family. It was formerly included within the genus Saxifraga until recent DNA evidence showed the members of what is now Micranthes are more closely related to Boykinia and Heuchera than to other members of the genus Saxifraga.

All members of this genus are herbaceous, with prominent basal leaves. They are found in north-temperate, arctic, and alpine regions.

Species
The following species are recognised in the genus Micranthes:

Micranthes apetala 
Micranthes aprica  – Sierra saxifrage
Micranthes astilboides 
Micranthes atrata 
Micranthes brachypetala 
Micranthes bryophora 
Micranthes californica 
Micranthes calycina 
Micranthes careyana 
Micranthes caroliniana 
Micranthes cismagadanica 
Micranthes clavistaminea 
Micranthes clusii 
Micranthes davidii 
Micranthes davurica 
Micranthes divaricata 
Micranthes dungbooi 
Micranthes eriophora 
Micranthes ferruginea  – Rustyhair saxifrage
Micranthes foliolosa  – Leafy saxifrage
Micranthes fragosa 
Micranthes fusca 
Micranthes gageana 
Micranthes gaspensis  – Gaspé saxifrage
Micranthes gormanii 
Micranthes hieraciifolia  – Hawkweed-leaved saxifrage
Micranthes hitchcockiana 
Micranthes howellii 
Micranthes idahoensis 
Micranthes integrifolia  – Northwestern saxifrage
Micranthes japonica 
Micranthes kermodei 
Micranthes kikubuki 
Micranthes laciniata 
Micranthes lumpuensis 
Micranthes lyallii  – Redstem saxifrage
Micranthes manchuriensis 
Micranthes marshallii 
Micranthes melaleuca 
Micranthes melanocentra 
Micranthes merkii 
Micranthes mertensiana 
Micranthes mexicana 
Micranthes micranthidifolia  – Brook lettuce
Micranthes nelsoniana  – Heartleaf saxifrage
Micranthes nidifica  – Peak saxifrage, Alpine saxifrage
Micranthes nivalis  – Snow saxifrage, Alpine saxifrage
Micranthes nudicaulis 
Micranthes oblongifolia 
Micranthes occidentalis  – Western saxifrage
Micranthes odontoloma  – Streambank saxifrage
Micranthes oregana  – Bog saxifrage
Micranthes pallida 
Micranthes palmeri  – Palmer's saxifrage
Micranthes paludosa 
Micranthes parvula 
Micranthes pensylvanica  – Swamp saxifrage
Micranthes petiolaris 
Micranthes pluviarum 
Micranthes pseudopallida 
Micranthes punctata 
Micranthes purpurascens 
Micranthes razshivinii  – Razshivin's saxifrage
Micranthes redofskyi 
Micranthes reflexa  – Yukon saxifrage
Micranthes rhomboidea  – Diamondleaf saxifrage
Micranthes rubriflora 
Micranthes rufidula  – Redwool saxifrage
Micranthes rufopilosa 
Micranthes sachalinensis 
Micranthes spicata  – Spiked saxifrage
Micranthes staminosa 
Micranthes stellaris  – Starry saxifrage, Star saxifrage
Micranthes subapetala 
Micranthes svetlanae 
Micranthes tempestiva 
Micranthes tenuis  – Ottertail Pass saxifrage
Micranthes texana  – Texas saxifrage
Micranthes tilingiana 
Micranthes tischii 
Micranthes tolmiei  – Tolmie's saxifrage
Micranthes unalaschcensis 
Micranthes virginiensis  – Early saxifrage, Virginia saxifrage
Micranthes zekoensis

References

 
Saxifragaceae genera